Akkol, meaning "White Lake", is a salt lake in Zhangeldi District, in the SW sector of the Kostanay Region, Kazakhstan.

Local authorities try to promote tourism in the lake, but the area lacks the necessary infrastructure. The nearest inhabited locality is Akhmeta Baytursynuly  to the east of the eastern shore.

Geography
It is an endorheic lake sharing the same depression as smaller lakes and salt pans nearby. A projecting spit in the northwestern shore of the lake divides the northern side into two bays. Much smaller lakes Uziksor and Karaksor are located to the southeast, close to its shores. There is a hot spring  from the lake where the water temperature reaches 

 long river Uly-Zhylanshyk flows into the northeastern shore of the lake.

See also
List of lakes of Kazakhstan

References

External links

Белоснежное соленое озеро Акколь в Костанайской области может постигнуть судьба Кобейтуза (in Russian)

Lakes of Kazakhstan
Endorheic lakes of Asia
Kostanay Region